Whither Shall I Wander? is the final episode of the fifth series of the period drama Upstairs, Downstairs, and the concluding episode of the original 1970s run of the programme. It first aired on 21 December 1975 on ITV. For many years it represented the conclusion of the story of 165 Eaton Place, until 2010 when the BBC revived the programme with a new series.

Plot
The family solicitor, Sir Geoffrey Dillon, stops by to advise of the massive debts left by the late James Bellamy and advises that 165 Eaton Place be liquidated by his creditors.  Georgina, without any finances and refusing to accept charity, decides that her wedding must be put off due to the financial obligations, but Virginia and Geoffrey conspire to secretly transfer £2000 from Virginia's investments to Georgina as a last-minute windfall from James' estate and the wedding is set for 12 June, flourished with a massive cake baked by Mrs. Bridges.  We see the reception but not the actual wedding, and the plot moves on to those of 165 Eaton Place going their respective ways after being allowed to take keepsakes from their time at 165.  Richard, Virginia, and the children move away to a small house retaining Rose as lady's maid, while Daisy and Edward are retained by the newlyweds. Mr. Hudson and Mrs. Bridges announce that they married in a brief civil ceremony ("...in the eyes of the Lord, better late than never.")  Ruby aspires to move on to other lines of service and become an usherette, but Mr. and Mrs. Hudson, feeling that simple Ruby would be unable to fend for herself, decide to take her along to their boarding house by the sea.  (Sadly, Angela Baddely [Mrs. Bridges] died the next year and, with her, the anticipated spin-off series.)  The series concludes with Rose walking alone through the abandoned, lifeless house, recalling memories associated with each room, and finally leaving the property, which bears a sign showing that it has been listed for sale.

The opening credits state that this episode takes place in the summer of 1930.

Cast
Lesley-Anne Down - Georgina Worsley
Raymond Huntley—Geoffrey Dillon
Hannah Gordon - Virginia Bellamy
David Langton - Richard Bellamy
Gordon Jackson - Angus Hudson
Jean Marsh - Rose Buck
Angela Baddeley - Kate Bridges
Joan Benham - Lady Prudence Fairfax
Ursula Howells - Duchess of Buckminster
Christopher Beeny - Edward Barnes
Jacqueline Tong - Daisy Peel Barnes
Jenny Tomasin - Ruby Finch
Anthony Andrews - Marquis of Stockbridge
Anne Yarker - Alice Hamilton

Footnotes

References
Richard Marson, "Inside UpDown - The Story of Upstairs, Downstairs", Kaleidoscope Publishing, 2005
 - Upstairs, Downstairs Fansite

Upstairs, Downstairs (series 5) episodes
1975 British television episodes
Fiction set in 1930